Lake Piva is a reservoir in Montenegro. It is located in the northwest part of the country, in Plužine Municipality. The surface of the lake is 12.5 km², the length is 45 km, and the maximum depth is 188 m. The elevation is 675 m above sea level.

The artificial lake is the result of the construction of Mratinje Dam on the Piva river. On the bottom of the lake there is the old town Plužine; Piva Monastery was also there, but it has been relocated. The new location of the monastery is 8 km from Plužine, and 3.5 km away from the original location of the monastery. The relocation has started in 1969 and finished in 1982.

References 

https://web.archive.org/web/20131126132358/http://pluzine.travel/page.php?id=89
http://www.montenegrina.net/pages/pages1/crnom_gorom/pivsko_jezero_v_karas.html
http://www.insight-montenegro.com/en/destinations/northern-region/piva-lake-and-piva-river-montenegro.html

Piva
Piva
Bodies of water of Montenegro
Plužine Municipality